Sir Syed Mosque is a mosque located in the heart of Aligarh Muslim University campus. It is located inside Sir Syed Hall. The tomb of Sir Syed Ahmed Khan is also enclosed within the walls of the mosque.

History 
The construction of Jama Masjid was started in 1879 by the founder of the University, Sir Syed Ahmad Khan and completed in January 1915.

Architecture 
The design of the mosque resembles the huge Mughal Badshahi Mosque of Lahore.

See also
Aligarh Muslim University
Syed Ahmed Khan
Aligarh
List of mosques in India

References

Notes
http://www.columbia.edu/itc/mealac/pritchett/00routesdata/1800_1899/aligarhmao/jamamasjid/jamamasjid.html Columbia University
https://www.thehindu.com/opinion/columns/the-aligarh-connection/article19241453.ece The Hindu
http://twocircles.net/2015jan10/1420903637.html

Mosques in Uttar Pradesh
Buildings and structures in Aligarh